The  (CRE,   or French Energy Regulatory Commission under its official English title) is an independent body that regulates the French electricity and gas markets. It is a member of the European Union organisation ACER and the all-European CEER (Council of European Energy Regulators).

References 

Electric power in France
Energy regulatory authorities
Organizations established in 2000
Energy in France
Energy organizations